Huma Mahmood Abedin (born July 28, 1975) is an American political staffer who was vice chair of Hillary Clinton's 2016 campaign for President of the United States. Before that, Abedin was deputy chief of staff to Clinton when she was U.S. Secretary of State from 2009 to 2013. She was also the traveling chief of staff and former assistant to Clinton during her 2008 presidential campaign for the Democratic nomination in the 2008 presidential election.

During Hillary Clinton's tenure at the State Department and her presidential campaign, Abedin became one of Clinton's closest aides. Her high-profile political career has caused her personal life to come under public scrutiny over the years, particularly her marriage to former congressman Anthony Weiner.

Early life 
Abedin was born on July 28, 1975, in Kalamazoo, Michigan, to two professors. Abedin is of Indian and Pakistani descent. She has a sister and a brother.

When Abedin was two years old, her parents were offered jobs at the University of Jeddah in Saudi Arabia. Abedin moved with her family to Jeddah where she was raised and lived until returning to the United States for college. Abedin traveled frequently during her childhood and teenage years, and attended a British girls' school. Her father died from progressive renal failure when she was 17.

As a teenager, she aspired to be a journalist like her role model Christiane Amanpour and wanted to work in the White House press office. At George Washington University, she earned a Bachelor of Arts degree as a journalism major with a minor in political science.

Born in the US, she felt more at home in Saudi Arabia during her stay. Her parents and siblings assimilated as Americans, but the family kept their own "cultural and religious values.”

Career 
While a student at George Washington University, Abedin began working as an intern in the White House in 1996, assigned to then-First Lady Hillary Clinton. From 1996 to 2008, she was an assistant editor of the Journal of Muslim Minority Affairs. For several years, she served as the back-up to Clinton's personal aide. She officially took over as Clinton's aide and personal advisor during Clinton's successful 2000 U.S. Senate campaign in New York and later worked as traveling chief of staff and "body woman" during Clinton's unsuccessful campaign for the 2008 Democratic presidential nomination. According to a number of Clinton associates, Abedin is a trusted advisor to Clinton, particularly on the Middle East, and has become known for that expertise.

2009–2013: State Department, Clinton Foundation, Teneo 

In 2009, Abedin was appointed deputy chief of staff to Clinton in the State Department. After returning from maternity leave in June 2012, she left her position as Clinton's deputy chief of staff and became a special Government employee, a consultant role; this status allowed Abedin to work for private clients as a consultant while also serving as an adviser to the Secretary of State. Under this arrangement, she did consultant work for Teneo, a strategic consulting firm whose clients included Coca-Cola and MF Global, and served as a paid consultant to the Clinton Foundation, while continuing her role as body woman to Clinton. She failed to disclose her consulting work done while a State Department aide. The New York Times reported that an associate of Abedin's said the arrangement also allowed her to work from her home in New York City rather than at the State Department's headquarters in Washington to be able to spend more time with her child and husband.

After leaving her post at the State Department in 2013, Abedin served as director of the transition team that helped Clinton return to private life, and continued her work for the Clinton Foundation. Eleven days before leaving the State Department, Abedin set up a private consulting firm, Zain Endeavors LLC.

Clinton's 2016 presidential campaign 
Starting in 2015, Abedin served as vice-chairperson for Hillary Clinton's 2016 campaign for president, while continuing to serve as personal assistant to Clinton. In her role as the campaign's vice-chairperson, she screened and interviewed applicants for key campaign roles, including campaign manager Robby Mook, and was the primary channel for communications with Clinton before the campaign officially began. After Republican presidential candidate Donald Trump proposed banning Muslims from entering the United States, Abedin wrote an email to Clinton supporters calling herself "a proud Muslim" and criticized Trump's plan as "literally (writing) racism into our law books".

Memoir

Abedin wrote a memoir titled Both/And: A Life in Many Worlds, published in November 2021. The book covers her childhood in Saudi Arabia, her Muslim faith, her time as an aide to Clinton and her relationship with ex-husband former Democratic Representative Anthony Weiner. She has said that writing the book was a therapeutic process, helping her work through a tumultuous time as a result of Weiner's multiple scandals. In the memoir, Abedin also explores the multiple identities that have shaped her, in particular being born in Michigan and then raised in Saudi Arabia by a Pakistani father and an Indian mother.

In the memoir, Abedin wrote that in the mid-2000s, an unnamed U.S. senator had "kissed me, pushing his tongue into my mouth, pressing me back on the sofa"; she wrote that she had "buried" the incident until accusations of sexual assault against Supreme Court justice Brett Kavanaugh in 2018 triggered her memory. In an interview with CBS News Sunday Morning to promote the book, she said she did not feel that the senator was sexually assaulting her in that moment.

Abedin appeared on the podcast, The Literary City with Ramjee Chandran, to discuss her memoir. She says the title of the book best describes the plurality she feels in her daily life and her career.

Debunked accusations by Republican members of Congress 
In a letter dated June 13, 2012, to the State Department Inspector General, five Republican members of Congress—Michele Bachmann of Minnesota, Trent Franks of Arizona, Louie Gohmert of Texas, Thomas J. Rooney of Florida, and Lynn Westmoreland of Georgia—claimed that Abedin "has three family members—her late father, her mother and her brother—connected to Muslim Brotherhood operatives and/or organizations." The five alleged that Abedin had "immediate family connections to foreign extremist organizations" which they said were "potentially disqualifying conditions for obtaining a security clearance" and questioned why Abedin had not been disqualified for a security clearance.

The letters' claims were debunked and flagged as conspiracy theories. The Washington Post editorial board called the allegations "paranoid", a "baseless attack", and a "smear". The letter was also criticized by, among others, House Minority Leader Nancy Pelosi and Representative Keith Ellison, Democrat of Minnesota, the first Muslim member of Congress, who called the allegations "reprehensible". Senator John McCain, Republican of Arizona, also rejected the allegations, saying: "The letter and the report offer not one instance of an action, a decision or a public position that Huma has taken while at the State Department that would lend credence to the charge that she is promoting anti-American activities within our government. These attacks on Huma have no logic, no basis and no merit." Bachmann's former campaign manager Ed Rollins said the allegations were "extreme and dishonest", and called for Bachmann to apologize to Abedin. The Anti-Defamation League condemned the letter, calling upon the representatives involved to "stop trafficking in anti-Muslim conspiracy theories".

Congressional inquiries

Outside employment while at State Department 
Senate Judiciary Committee Chairman Chuck Grassley, Republican of Iowa, raised questions about Abedin's work as a State Department employee, concerning the fact that she held four jobs from June 2012 to February 2013. These included serving as a part-time aide to Clinton at the State Department while also working as a consultant to private clients for the consulting firm Teneo Holdings, a consulting firm run by Douglas Band, a longtime aide to former president Bill Clinton. At the time, she was also being paid a salary for work at the Clinton Foundation, and working as Hillary Clinton's personal assistant. The State Department and Abedin both responded, with the State Department indicating that it uses special government employees routinely "to provide services and expertise that executive agencies require", and Abedin stating that she did not provide any government information or inside information gained from her State Department job to her private employers. Grassley said he found the letters unresponsive. In July 2015, Grassley released information indicating that the State Department's inspector general had found that Abedin was overpaid by almost $10,000 for unused leave time when she left the government, resulting from violations of the rules governing vacation and sick leave during her tenure on the payroll as a Federal employee in the department. Abedin's attorneys said that she had learned in May that the Department's inspector general had found that she improperly collected $9,857 for periods when she was on vacation or leave, responded with a 12-page letter contesting the findings, and formally requested an administrative review of the investigation's conclusions. Her lawyer, Miguel Rodriguez, told The New York Times that the inspector general's report showed that Abedin worked during her maternity leave and had thus earned the pay.

Employment records and emails 
In October 2015, a federal court in Washington, D.C., heard arguments on a Freedom of Information Act (FOIA) request by conservative watchdog organization Judicial Watch for records related to Abedin. Judicial Watch asked to make Abedin's emails and employment records public, requesting details of the arrangement under which she was designated a "special government employee", allowing her to also perform outside consulting work while on the federal payroll. On October 6, the State Department said it would be able to hand over 69 pages of emails in response to the FOIA request.

In 2015, emails by Abedin became part of the FBI investigation and controversy concerning Hillary Clinton's private email account while she was Secretary of State, resulting in various allegations by Republicans of violations of State Department regulations. Some officials within the intelligence community have stated that potentially classified information was contained in e-mails from Abedin relating to the 2012 Benghazi attack and its aftermath, which had been sent through Clinton's private, non-government server. As of February 2016, 1,818 emails were found containing classified information on the private server; 22 of those were classified as Top Secret. They were not marked classified at the time they were sent, but they did contain classified information. Clinton's aides also sent and received classified information.

House Benghazi Committee testimony 
On October 16, 2015, Abedin testified in closed session before the House Select Committee on Benghazi, in a session that was expected to focus on the 2012 Benghazi attack during which Ambassador J. Christopher Stevens and three other Americans were killed. The committee had previously heard closed-door testimony from two other Clinton aides, Cheryl Mills and Jake Sullivan, in September 2015, and Clinton appeared before the panel in a public hearing on October 22.

The Republican-led committee's top Democratic representative, Elijah Cummings of Maryland, questioned the panel's decision to hear testimony from Abedin, arguing that her knowledge of details at the time of the attacks was minimal. Republican Representative Mike Pompeo of Kansas defended the decision to interview Abedin, saying: "Ms. Abedin was a senior official at the State Department at all of the relevant times. Every witness has a different set of knowledge." Although there were political tensions surrounding Abedin's appearance, the proceedings were friendly. After almost eight hours of testimony, Abedin said: "I came here today to be as helpful as I could be to the committee."

2015 State Department subpoena 
In February 2016, The Washington Post reported that the United States Department of State had issued a subpoena to the Clinton Foundation in the fall of 2015. According to the report, the subpoena focused on documents about the charity's projects that may have required approval from the federal government during Clinton's term as secretary of state; it also asked for records related to Abedin.

On October 28, 2016, the FBI announced that while investigating illicit text messages allegedly from Anthony Weiner to a 15-year-old girl in North Carolina, they discovered emails related to Clinton's private server on a laptop computer belonging to Weiner, Abedin's husband at the time. FBI Director James Comey said the agency would review the e-mails to see if they contained classified material. Clinton called for the FBI to release its findings as soon as possible. CNN reported that "the Justice Department and FBI officials are working to secure approval that would allow the FBI to conduct a full search of top Hillary Clinton aide Huma Abedin's newly discovered emails." The issue is complex because Abedin shared a computer with Weiner, according to officials, and the case may raise "spousal privilege legal protections" for Abedin since the laptop belongs to her husband.

The FBI's New York field office was conducting the Weiner investigation and found the Abedin emails on the computer, which they thought were only Weiner's, the officials said. They then stopped their work and contacted the team of investigators from FBI headquarters who had handled the probe of Clinton's private email server. The investigators saw enough of the emails to decide that they seemed pertinent to the Clinton server investigation and that they might be emails not seen before. Because they felt they needed a warrant specific to Abedin's emails, officials did not examine them further.

Abedin cooperated with the investigation, according to Justice Department and FBI officials. Investigators believed that some emails deleted from the Clinton server were possibly among those in question. They would need to interview Abedin again after examining the emails on Weiner's computer.

On October 30, 2016, the FBI obtained a search warrant for the Abedin-linked emails found on Weiner's laptop. Abedin used the same laptop to send thousands of emails to Clinton, according to NBC sources. On November 6, in a letter to Congress, the FBI said that, after reviewing all of Clinton's emails from her tenure as Secretary of State, it had not changed its conclusion reached in July exonerating Clinton.

Personal life 
Abedin is a practicing Muslim. In addition to English and Urdu, Abedin also speaks fluent Arabic.

Abedin started dating then-U.S. Representative Anthony Weiner in 2007, and they were engaged in 2009. They were married on July 10, 2010, with former U.S. President Bill Clinton officiating the wedding ceremony. In December 2011, Abedin gave birth to a boy. On August 29, 2016, Abedin announced her separation from Weiner after new sexting allegations were made against him. In early 2017, Abedin announced her intent to file for divorce with sole physical custody of their son. On May 19, 2017, after Weiner pled guilty, she filed for divorce. Abedin and Weiner withdrew their divorce case in January 2018, stating that they decided to settle privately in order to spare their son further embarrassment. As of November 2021, their divorce is in its final stages, although they still see each other and raise their son.

Hillary Clinton has been described as a mentor and mother figure to Abedin. In 2010, at Abedin's wedding to Weiner, Clinton said: "I have one daughter. But if I had a second daughter, it would [be] Huma." During a trip that Clinton and Abedin made to Saudi Arabia, Abedin's mother said to Clinton, "Hillary, you have spent more time with my daughter than I have in the past 15 years. I'm jealous of you!"

In a May 2022 interview, Abedin said she struggles with anxiety and has been in therapy due to the shock and trauma of dealing with her husband's sexting scandal. She also said she has started dating again and feels excited about the process. In July 2022 it was reported that Abedin was in a relationship with actor Bradley Cooper.

In popular culture 
Abedin is featured in Weiner, a documentary about her former husband's unsuccessful 2013 campaign for Mayor of New York.

In July 2022, Freida Pinto announced she would be developing and starring in a television series based upon Abedin's memoir. Abedin will be an executive producer of the program along with Emily Verellen.

References

External links 

 
 Collected news and coverage at The Washington Post
 
 "Hillary's Shadow" by Politico

1975 births
American expatriates in Saudi Arabia
American Muslims
American people of Indian descent
Anthony Weiner
Clinton administration personnel
Columbian College of Arts and Sciences alumni
Hillary Clinton
Living people
New York (state) Democrats
People associated with the 2016 United States presidential election
People from Jeddah
People from Kalamazoo, Michigan
Political campaign staff
Spouses of New York (state) politicians